Tharon Rex Mayes (born September 9, 1968) is an American former professional basketball player. Born in New Haven, Connecticut, USA, he was listed at 6'3" tall and weighed 175 lbs.

Career 
Mayes played collegiate ball with the Florida State University Seminoles (1987–1990). He scored 1260 points (16.4 ppg) for Florida State and had a total of 132 steals. Scoring 23.3 points per game in the 1989-90 campaign, he put up the third-best season scoring average in FSU history. In the team's media guide, Mayes was described as "a defensive terror because of his lightning-quick hand". In January 1990, he was suspended indefinitely after an altercation with a parking meter patrolman.

He played the majority of his professional basketball career in the CBA for the Sioux Falls Skyforce (1990–1992), Grand Rapids Hoops (1993), Fargo-Moorhead Fever (1993–1994) and Yakima Sun Kings (1997). In 1990-91, Mayes scored 25.1 points per contest for the Skyforce, making him the third leading scorer of the CBA season. His 1354 points this season were the most in a single season in franchise history. He participated in the NBA with brief stints with the Philadelphia 76ers (1991) and Los Angeles Clippers (1992). In the NBA, Mayes saw action in a total of 24 games, averaging 4.1 points a game.

He also played overseas in Belgium for Castors Braine (1992–1993), in the Philippines for Purefoods TJ Hotdogs (1993) and Formula Shell Zoom Masters (1996), in Germany for Rhöndorfer TV (1995–1996; with 17.7 ppg in 23 appearances, he was the team's leading scorer), in Spain for Breogán Lugo (1994–1995; 38 games: 22.6 ppg), Covirán Sierra Nevada (1997–1998; 28 games: 15.9 ppg) and Recreativos Orenes Murcia (1998–1999; 12 games: 14.2 ppg), and in Israel for Hapoel Tsfat (1996–1997) and Hapoel Holon (1999–2000; 9 games: 12.2 ppg).

After retiring, Mayes settled in Toronto and started a basketball camp. In 2003, he decided to come back to Florida State University with the goal to finish his degree in criminology. Mayes worked in youth programs in Toronto, Florida, Boston and in his hometown, where he became the sports director of the Boys & Girls Club of New Haven in 2009.

Notable awards 
 CBA All-Rookie (1991)
 CBA All-Star (1991)
 Named one of the 20 Greatest Players in the history of the Sioux Fall Skyforce

Personal life
Mayes is the stepfather of the former Florida State player Xavier Rathan-Mayes.

External links
 Skyforce 20 Greatest Players
 NBA career statistics

References 

1968 births
Living people
American expatriate basketball people in Belgium
American expatriate basketball people in Germany
American expatriate basketball people in Israel
American expatriate basketball people in Spain
American men's basketball players
Basketball players from Connecticut
CB Breogán players
CB Granada players
CB Murcia players
Fargo-Moorhead Fever players
Florida State Seminoles men's basketball players
Grand Rapids Hoops players
Liga ACB players
Los Angeles Clippers players
Philadelphia 76ers players
San Diego Stingrays players
Shooting guards
Sioux Falls Skyforce (CBA) players
Undrafted National Basketball Association players
Yakima Sun Kings players
American expatriate basketball people in the Philippines
Magnolia Hotshots players
Philippine Basketball Association imports
Shell Turbo Chargers players